The Tangier Speech was a momentous speech appealing for the independence and territorial unity of Morocco, delivered by Sultan Muhammad V of Morocco on April 9, 1947 at the Mendoubia in what was then the Tangier International Zone, complemented by a second speech the next day at the Grand Mosque of Tangier. At the time, Morocco was under French and Spanish colonial rule, with Tangier designated as an international zone.

Background 
The Istiqlal Party's presented the Proclamation of the Independence of Morocco January 11, 1944. In this document, the nationalist party allied itself with the symbolic figure of Sultan Muhammad V. The proclamation was met with hostility from the French colonial authorities; Ahmed Balafrej, Lyazidi, and 18 others were arrested, and a wave of protests took place in cities throughout the country.

Casablanca Tirailleurs Massacre 

In the days leading up to the sultan's speech, French colonial forces in Casablanca, specifically Senegalese Tirailleurs serving the French colonial empire, carried out a massacre of working class Moroccans. The massacre lasted for about 24 hours from April 7–8, 1947, as the tirailleurs fired randomly into residential buildings in working-class neighborhoods, killing 180 Moroccan civilians. The conflict was instigated in attempt to sabotage the Sultan's journey to Tangier. The Sultan returned to Casablanca to comfort the families of the victims, then proceeded to Tangier to deliver the historic speech.

Speech and consequences 
The Sultan, in his speech, addressed Morocco's future and its territorial integrity without once mentioning France directly. He emphasized his role as Sovereign, his place under Allah, Morocco's ties to the Arab world, and his responsibilities to his people. The Sultan went on to describe how he envisioned the country to operate, with exhortations to the faithful.  

According to Mohammed Lahbabi of the USFP, Mehdi Ben Barka prepared the sultan's speech. Eirik Labonne, the French resident général in Morocco at the time, had included a statement at the end of the speech for the Sultan to read which encouraged the Moroccans to work with the French, but the Sultan refused to read it. 

Labonne, a career diplomat, was called back and replaced with General Alphonse Juin, a military man, to reenforce French authority at the center of the protectorat regime.

See also
 Mohammed V Mosque, Tangier

References 

1947 speeches
History of Morocco
1947 in Morocco
April 1947 events in Africa